Nick Courtright (born 1981) is an American poet. He is the author of Let There Be Light, Punchline, and the chapbook Elegy for the Builder's Wife. His poetry has appeared in The Southern Review, Boston Review, Massachusetts Review, Kenyon Review Online, Gulf Coast, New Orleans Review, The Literati Quarterly and many others. He is the executive editor of Atmosphere Press.

Life
Nick Courtright received his B.S.S from Ohio University before earning his M.F.A. from the Texas State University MFA program. He earned a PhD from The University of Texas. His first book of poetry, Punchline, was published by Gold Wake Press in 2012; the book was a finalist for the National Poetry Series. The book was inspired by William Blake, Walt Whitman, Federico García Lorca, and Wallace Stevens, as well as the Bhagavad Gita.

Punchline has been critically praised, with one reviewer citing its "Grand, sweeping themes (mysticism, physics, mythology, cosmology)...crafted into terse lyrics, as if Emily Dickinson had revised Leaves of Grass on her tiny desktop, under an ominous light." Another praised the book's "the-universe-is-expanding soul-searching that's fueled insomniac nights for as long as that universe has had a name." It has also been called a "stunning first collection of poems, invok[ing] the everyday as a point of entry to compelling philosophical questions."  Prior to the release of the book, the Best American Poetry website referred to Courtright's work as "vital stuff. This is real, and it’s happening right now."

From 2007-2013 Courtright wrote for the culture website Austinist, serving in the latter years as interviews editor.  He taught in Austin, Texas at The University of Texas, and Austin Community College until 2019. He has two sons, William and Samuel, and his partner is the poet Lisa Mottolo.

Bibliography

Poetry

 Chapbook: Elegy for the Builder's Wife (Blue Hour Press, 2010)
 Book: Punchline (Gold Wake Press, 2012)
 Book: Let There Be Light (Gold Wake Press, 2014)
 Book: The Forgotten World (Gold Wake Press, 2021)

References

External links
Nick Courtright website
Courtright's CV
Poets & Writers entry

1981 births
Living people
American male poets
English-language poets
Chapbook writers
21st-century American poets
21st-century American male writers